Clumsy is the second studio album by the Canadian rock band Our Lady Peace, released on January 23, 1997 by Columbia Records. The album is the band's most successful to date, achieving diamond status in Canada (1 million units sold) and strong sales in other countries, including platinum status in the U.S. for another 1 million sales. In 2007, it ranked No. 76 on "The Top 100 Canadian Albums" by Bob Mersereau and No. 33 on The Top 102 New Rock Albums of All Time by 102.1 The Edge (in 2009). The album features five hit singles: "Superman's Dead", "Automatic Flowers", "Clumsy", "4am" and "Carnival". Each single except "Carnival" has a music video.

Background 

While on tour in support of Naveed the band attempted to begin writing for their next album. Like most bands, the challenges of writing a successful follow-up album was found to be difficult as each member now approached the writing process from a different set of experiences, personal goals, and influences from their time spent touring. Collaborations between band members and the co-writing producer broke down and writing sessions at the producer's studio resulted in nothing of use. The decision was made by Raine Maida that the way to resolve the situation was to change the line-up. It was either Mike Turner or Chris Eacrett. The concern then turned to what challenges would be faced with the task of replacing either. With Turner threatening legal recourse and Maida's school friend Duncan Coutts a bass player in his own band, the choice was simple. Immediately following the band's opening stint with Van Halen, Coutts was asked to join the band to be its new permanent bass player. "I don't want to call our old bass player Chris a weak link...I think he's a talented musician, just different from us." claimed Maida at the time of the announcement. Turner would be later fired from the group in the first week of writing with producer Bob Rock (Aerosmith, Metallica, Bon Jovi, Motley Crue) on a subsequent album.

Writing 
As touring continued, the band began writing again with Duncan. One of the first songs they wrote was the eventual concert favorite "Trapeze", which they played live along with two other newly written songs "Home" and "Disgusted". "Disgusted" would evolve into "Spider Gun" and eventually became the track "Big Dumb Rocket". In December 1995 the band began intensive writing and demoing sessions in a rented rehearsal space. Despite coming up with several new ideas, the band found that writing while on tour was very difficult because they couldn't give the songs their undivided attention and most of their early ideas were scrapped because the band wasn't satisfied with them. "Trapeze" would make it to recording but the track was eventually cut and has yet to be released.

Pre-production for the album was set to begin in January 1996. Producer Arnold Lanni noticed the band's discontent with the songs they were writing. "I went down to see them and knew it wasn't happening", he recalled. "All their friends and family were calling them up. You sell that many records, you're on everybody's A-list, everybody blows sunshine up your butt and sometimes you believe the hype. We had to pull the plug on that scenario." At Lanni's suggestion, the band and him traveled to Duncan's rural lakeside cottage near Muskoka, Ontario, in order to concentrate on writing and recording demos for the album without distractions from family, friends or the media. While there, the band lived together in the cottage surrounded by instruments. A tape recorder was left on in the house all day to pick up any ideas being played. Lanni and the band members would usually play ice hockey in the afternoon and collaborate on songs in the evening and into the night. By the end of their stay, around 20 songs had been written. When they returned to the Toronto studio in February, according to Mike Turner, "When we came back to record, it just came together".

Recording and production 
Recording sessions for the yet untitled album began on February 8, 1996. The band was asked to record the Beatles song "Tomorrow Never Knows" for the soundtrack to the upcoming movie The Craft after several bands they had played with on tour knew them to play it well live. The song was recorded on the very first day of recording with Arnold Lanni and was mixed by Ralph Sall for the soundtrack. They then proceeded to pare down the twenty tracks they had written to the twelve they wanted to record. "The Story of 100 Aisles", originally called "Anacin", was the first song recorded and has a sound closer to Naveed than any other song on the album. "We just wanted to go in and give all these songs ideas their own life and play with them and rearrange them and all that until we're completely happy with it." said Duncan Coutts, "If they sound just like Naveed or if they don't, it wasn't a huge concern. We just wanted to make each song the best it could be."

The album was recorded in two parts. Five or six tracks were recorded and finished by April 1996 so the band could review them. These included the base tracks for "Clumsy", "Hello Oskar", "Carnival", "Shaking", "Let You Down" and "Sleeping In", which didn't make the album. The band's feedback directed the next set of songs recorded around June, which included "Superman's Dead" and  a re-recording of "Hello Oscar". Raine Maida said in an interview, "We took a lot of time experimenting. The album was really done in three months. We took another two months to really go back over stuff and re-record. It's neat to look back and know the extra time we took was important to the record." Around this time (April), the working title of the album was Propeller, as Raine explained, "as in, that which causes forward movement." This was probably as a testament to the band's evolution since their debut album. Another working title was Trapeze, named after the song that didn't make the album. The cover art proves that this title came close to being chosen. The name was changed to Clumsy in early September. Recording wrapped up by the end of that month. The album was mastered at Gateway Studios in Portland, Maine by Bob Ludwig.

Style and themes 
Raine stated that there was a kind of "Carnival atmosphere" to the whole album and that many of the lyrics he wrote were set at the circus or a carnival. 
Clumsy'''s songs feature the striking vocals of lead vocalist Raine Maida, who utilizes an often jarring falsetto technique: Maida jumps from lower octaves in his vocal range to higher ones.  Raine's vocals provide most of the melody of the songs, with guitars quieted down in this album compared to Naveed, their previous album. This aspect of singing has become the staple sound of the band, continuing with this fashion in their next studio album Happiness...Is Not a Fish That You Can Catch, and since lost on their 2005 album Healthy in Paranoid Times.. In a January 1997 interview, the band stated that then new bassist Duncan Coutts, who also plays cello, keyboards and sings background vocals, influenced the sound on Clumsy even though he doesn't have any songwriting credits. He broadened the band's palette of sounds. Given those new parameters, the band couldn't help but change their sound.

Release

In early 1996, Our Lady Peace's American label, Relativity Records, in a decision to switch to an urban format, eliminated ten label positions in their Rock category, including OLP. They moved to another Sony-owned label, Columbia Records for the release of Clumsy's first single in Canada, "Superman's Dead". Columbia would handle all of the band's releases in both Canada and the United States.

Commercial performanceClumsy debuted at #1 in Canada, selling 26,000 copies in Canada during its first week. It would go on to become Our Lady Peace's best-selling album. On February 28, 2001, the album was certified Diamond in Canada. On July 12, 2004, Clumsy was certified Platinum in the United States. Between 1996 and 2016, Clumsy was the best-selling album by a Canadian band in Canada and the eight best-selling album by a Canadian artist overall in Canada.  Radio station Edge 102 (aka CFNY), the most-listened to alternative rock station in Canada, listed Clumsy as the No. 1 album for 1997, based on sales, listener requests for songs and listener votes for the year's top album.

 Tours 
Our Lady Peace toured in support of Clumsy from a month before the album's release in early 1997 and into 1998. The first leg of the tour, focusing on Canadian colleges, kicked off at Loyalist College in Belleville, Ontario on January 13, 1997 where eight of the album's eleven tracks were premiered including "Superman's Dead", "4 AM" and others. This leg of the tour continued until March 1997, ending with a private music industry show at the Elbow Room in New York City.

The tour's second leg began on May 2, with the band playing two shows in Michigan before going off to Europe to promote the album's recent release there. The band returned and toured across the United States, only dipping into Canada to play at the very first Summersault festival. The North American tour continued until the end of September 1997 when Our Lady Peace joined Everclear as an opening act with whom they would tour until the end of 1997.

In January 1998, the band embarked on a 22-date headlining tour across Canada which included several shows opening for The Rolling Stones. On February 26, Our Lady Peace began their first headlining tour in the United States with Headswim and Black Lab opening. Following this they returned to Europe again for a 14-show tour across Belgium, the Netherlands, France and Germany. Further touring in the U.S. with Third Eye Blind and Eve 6 lasted into September 1998. The year of touring was concluded with the second Summersault festival being held. Our Lady Peace would spend the rest of the year working on their third studio album, Happiness... Is Not a Fish That You Can Catch.

 Re-creation tour 
In December 2009, the band announced that they would be "recreating" both Clumsy and their 2000 record Spiritual Machines by performing them live in their entiretiesHarper, Kate "Our Lady Peace Playing Clumsy, Spiritual Machines On Tour " – Chartattack December 7, 2009. Retrieved December 13, 2009 throughout a new tour that began in March 2010; only nine months before the 10-year anniversary of the release of Spiritual Machines''.

Track listing

Personnel 
As listed in liner notes.

Musicians 
 Raine Maida – vocals, acoustic guitar, piano
 Duncan Coutts – bass guitar
 Jeremy Taggart – drums, percussion
 Mike Turner – electric guitar

Production 
 Angelo Caruso – additional engineering
 Arnold Lanni – production, engineering, mixing
 Bob Ludwig – mastering engineer
 Terrance Sawchuck – 2nd engineer

Artwork 
 Sonia D'Aloisio – inside photos
 Helios – design, art direction, color retouch
 Neil Hodge – inside photos
 Catherine McRae – art direction
 Our Lady Peace – art direction, individual band photos
 Kevin Westenberg – cover and tray photo

Charts

Weekly charts

Year-end charts

Certifications

Release history

References

External links 
 Clumsy lyrics at Rhapsody

1997 albums
Albums produced by Arnold Lanni
Columbia Records albums
Our Lady Peace albums
Juno Award for Rock Album of the Year albums